Heihachi may refer to:
 Heihachi Edajima, a character in Sakigake!! Otokojuku
 Heihachi Hayashida, a character in the Akira Kurosawa film Seven Samurai
 Heihachi Mishima, a main character in the Tekken video game series
 Heihachi, a character in the Takashi Miike film Sukiyaki Western Django